Nguyễn Xuân Luân (born 11 September 1987) is a Vietnamese footballer who plays for Bà Rịa Vũng Tàu as a defender.

References

1987 births
Living people
Vietnamese footballers
Association football defenders
V.League 1 players
Hanoi FC players
Thanh Hóa FC players
Becamex Binh Duong FC players
People from Nghệ An province